The 1955 Florida A&M Rattlers football team was an American football team that represented Florida A&M University as a member of the Southern Intercollegiate Athletic Conference (SIAC) during the 1955 college football season. In their 11th season under head coach Jake Gaither, the Rattlers compiled a 7–1–1 record, won the SIAC championship, and outscored opponents by a total of 369 to 94. The team played its home games at Bragg Stadium in Tallahassee, Florida. 

The Rattlers' sole loss was to undefeated  in the Orange Blossom Classic. Florida A&M had been favored prior to the game, but Grambling upset the Rattlers to win the black college football national championship. Florida A&M was ranked No. 3 in the final rankings of black college football times issued by the Pittsburgh Courier.

The team's statistical leaders included Willie Galimore with 780 rushing yards, Lawrence Williams with 299 passing yards, and Al Frazier with 258 receiving yards and 78 points scored. Galimore later played seven years with the Chicago Bears and was inducted into the College Football Hall of Fame.

Schedule

References

Florida AandM
Florida A&M Rattlers football seasons
Florida AandM Rattlers football